Pursuit of Happiness is the debut studio album by electronic music group Weekend Players, and so far remains their only album.  Three singles were released from the album: "21st Century", which charted at #21 on the UK Charts, "Into the Sun" and "I'll Be There", the latter hit #1 on the Hot Dance Music/Club Play chart in the US.

Two additional remixes of "I'll Be There" and "Into the Sun" were included for the US domestic release.

Track listing
 "I'll Be There" – 6:22
 "Best Days of Our Lives" – 4:03
 "21st Century" – 7:08
 "Jericho" – 6:41
 "Pursuit of Happiness" – 4:13
 "Angel" – 3:41
 "Into the Sun" – 7:22
 "Subway" – 5:17
 "Play On" – 6:08
 "Through the Trees" – 5:31
 "Higher Ground" – 6:02

2002 debut albums
Weekend Players albums